Sayf al-Din Muhammad (Persian: سیف الدین محمد) was the king of the Ghurid dynasty from 1161 to 1163. He was the son and successor of Ala al-Din Husayn.

Biography 
After the accession of Sayf, he began persecution of the Ismailis who were favored during the reign of his father. Sayf also freed the two sons of Baha al-Din Sam I, Ghiyath al-Din Muhammad and Mu'izz al-Din Muhammad. With the aid of Ghiyath al-Din Muhammad, Sayf later waged war against the Oghuz Turks. Sayf was betrayed and murdered during a battle in 1163 near Merv by a brother of the Ghurid general Warmesh ibn Shith, whom Sayf had executed. Sayf was then succeeded by Ghiyath.

References

Sources

 
 

12th-century Iranian people
Ghurid dynasty
1163 deaths
Year of birth missing